The Wyoming Cowboys football statistical leaders are individual statistical leaders of the Wyoming Cowboys football program in various categories, including passing, rushing, receiving, total offense, defensive stats, and kicking. Within those areas, the lists identify single-game, single-season, and career leaders. The Cowboys represent the University of Wyoming in the NCAA Division I FBS Mountain West Conference (MW).

Although Wyoming began competing in intercollegiate football in 1892, the school's official record book considers the "modern era" to have begun in 1951. Records from before this year are often incomplete and inconsistent, and they are generally not included in these lists.

These lists are dominated by more recent players for several reasons:
 Since 1951, seasons have increased from 10 games to 11 and then 12 games in length.
 The NCAA didn't allow freshmen to play varsity football until 1972 (with the exception of the World War II years), limiting players prior to 1972 to three-year careers.
 Bowl games only began counting toward single-season and career statistics in 2002. The Cowboys have played in seven bowl games since this decision, giving many recent players an extra game to accumulate statistics.
 The MW has held a conference championship game since 2013. The Cowboys played in this game in 2016, giving players in that season one more game to accumulate statistics.
 Due to COVID-19 issues, the NCAA ruled that the 2020 season would not count against the athletic eligibility of any football player, giving everyone who played in that season the opportunity for five years of eligibility instead of the normal four.

These lists are updated through the 2021 season.

Passing

Passing yards

Passing touchdowns

Rushing

Rushing yards

Rushing touchdowns

Receiving

Receptions

Receiving yards

Receiving touchdowns

Total offense
Total offense is the sum of passing and rushing statistics. It does not include receiving or returns.Total offense is the sum of passing and rushing statistics. It does not include receiving or returns.

Total offense yards

Touchdowns responsible for
"Touchdowns responsible for" is the NCAA's official term for combined passing and rushing touchdowns.

Defense

Interceptions

Tackles

Sacks

Kicking

Field goals made

References

Wyoming